V is the fifth studio album by the American rock band Wavves. The album was released on October 2, 2015, by Ghost Ramp and Warner Bros. Records.

Reception

Jon Caramanica of The New York Times called it "a peppy album about the tragic pleasures of wallowing in poor choices". He continued, "The balance of good cheer and dark clouds is partly in the arrangements — V comprises exceedingly bright songs verging on true pop-punk. It's probably the cleanest-sounding Wavves album to date." Collin Brennan in Consequence of Sound felt the album was "visceral and downright volatile [...] a self-assured record penned by a songwriter who's anything but sure of himself, and that dynamic shines right through the curtain of fuzz". In The 405, William Tomer commented that "one who chooses to listen to the album in full--an exceedingly easy task to do repeatedly given the immediate appeal of the record--will be treated to one of the most down-to-earth takes on what it is like to be actively battling your demons, internal or otherwise". Jon Dolan of Rolling Stone felt that "their songs have never been sharper, brighter or more confident".

Cover artwork
The album cover represents the Minor Arcana's card of Five of Cups.

Track listing

Charts

References

External links
 

2015 albums
Wavves albums
Warner Records albums
Albums recorded at Electro-Vox Recording Studios